inthinc Technology Solutions, Inc. is a Telematics service provider, headquartered in Salt Lake City, Utah, centered on driver safety, fleet management and compliance. inthinc technology is designed to help companies with fleet vehicles to save money by reducing driver accidents, avoiding federal and state penalties and conserving fuel. Known customers of inthinc include Boart Longyear, American Pest, Cintas, Barrick Gold and McCall Services. The company was acquired in 2017 by Orbcomm.

References

Trucking industry in the United States